The Gardens Ice House is a privately operated skating and fitness facility in Laurel, Maryland. Built on Fairland Regional Park land, the venue features an Olympic ice rink, two NHL rinks (the third of these added on January 1, 1999), and since November 2013, an outdoor mini-rink.

The Gardens is a public-private partnership between the Maryland-National Capital Park and Planning Commission and Top Shelf Development.  The facility hosts the Mid Atlantic Skating School, Gardens Figure Skating Club, and Potomac Curling Club, as well as the annual Maryland Scholastic High School Championship. It hosted the American Indoor Football league's Maryland Reapers in 2012 and Washington Eagles in 2013. The facility hosted the Washington Jr. Nationals from 2010 until their move to Vermont in 2014. The Gardens is the home arena for the Washington Power roller hockey team.

"Whitey's Pond", an outdoor skating venue open from November to March each year, had its grand opening at The Gardens on November 1, 2013.  Named in honor of veteran hockey rink owner Whitey Guenin of Indiana, the rink will feature 3 on 3 adult hockey, described at other rinks as a form of pond hockey.

As of early May 2020, The Gardens was being used as a temporary morgue while otherwise closed during the COVID-19 pandemic in the United States, with the bodies elevated from the ice, draped with Maryland flags, and guarded by Maryland Park Police officers while awaiting transportation elsewhere.

References

External links
 Official website

1996 establishments in Maryland
Buildings and structures in Laurel, Maryland
Sports venues in Maryland
Indoor ice hockey venues in Maryland
Sports venues completed in 1996
Curling in Maryland
Indoor arenas in Maryland